Our Lady and St Wilfrid's Church is a Roman Catholic church designed by Augustus Welby Northmore Pugin, completed in 1841. The church was designed for the Sarum Rite, and contains an Easter Sepulchre.

History
The church, designed by Augustus Pugin was built for a sum total of £2,586. The designs were originally commissioned by Henry Howard of nearby Corby Castle, and included plans for a presbytery and grounds.

The stained glass windows were presented by Philip Howard between 1860–1867 and contain images of St Thomas More and St Oliver Plunkett, amongst others. The glass was completed by John Hardman.

The church contains statues of Our Lady of Lourdes and the Sacred Heart of Jesus, as well as a mounted Infant of Prague. There is also a reliquary containing the relics of Saint Petronia which came to the parish from Cardinal Merry del Val via the Maxwell-Stuart family and the Benedictine nuns of Holme Eden Abbey.

Parish
Previously served by the Benedictines of Ampleforth Abbey, the church was sistered with St Ninian's Chapel in Brampton. Together with Our Lady and St Joseph's in Carlisle and St Ninian's, the church formsed part of the parish of Our Lady of Eden. This parish existed between 2014 and 2020. Our Lady of Eden then became part of the enlarger single Catholic parish of Our Lady of Perpetual Help for Carlisle and district. The parish is part of the Diocese of Lancaster.

Presently Mass is offered in the church on Thursday mornings at 10am

Parishes from Diocese of Lancaster, retrieved 26 December 2015</ref>

Interior

See also
 Augustus Welby Northmore Pugin
 Roman Catholic Diocese of Lancaster

References

External links
 
 Our Lady of Eden Parish site
 The Pugin Foundation - Our Lady and St. Wilfrid's, Warwick Bridge

Grade II* listed churches in Cumbria
Roman Catholic churches in Cumbria
Gothic Revival church buildings in England
Gothic Revival architecture in Cumbria
Roman Catholic Diocese of Lancaster
1841 establishments in England
Roman Catholic churches completed in 1841
19th-century Roman Catholic church buildings in the United Kingdom
Our Lady and St Wilfrid's Church